Józef Batkiewicz (born 22 February 1950), is a Polish former ice hockey player. He played for Podhale Nowy Targ during his career. He also played for the Polish national team at the 1972 Winter Olympics and multiple world championships.

References

External links
 

1950 births
Living people
Ice hockey players at the 1972 Winter Olympics
Olympic ice hockey players of Poland
People from Nowy Targ
Podhale Nowy Targ players
Polish ice hockey forwards
Sportspeople from Lesser Poland Voivodeship
20th-century Polish people